Druzhba is a rural locality (a settlement) and the administrative center of Bolshezhukovskoye Rural Settlement, Dyatkovsky District, Bryansk Oblast, Russia. The population was 1,605 as of 2010. There are 11 streets.

Geography 
Druzhba is located 5 km south of Dyatkovo (the district's administrative centre) by road. Dyatkovo is the nearest rural locality.

References 

Rural localities in Dyatkovsky District